Dejan Garača (born July 21, 1991) is a Swedish football player who plays as a goalkeeper for Assyriska United IK.

Club career

Born in Örebro, Garača played for BK Forward before he joined Malmö FF in 2008. During his time at the club he acted as third choice goalkeeper behind Johan Dahlin and Dušan Melichárek. He therefore went on two loan periods to IFK Malmö and IF Limhamn Bunkeflo. Garača was capped three times for Malmö FF in matches where both Dahlin and Melichárek were injured. Malmö FF chose not to offer Garača a new contract after the 2011 season.

On 25 February 2017 Dejan joined Lithuanian A Lyga side Utenis. He became main goalkeeper of the team, appearing in the first 10 league games, but after arrival of new head coach David Campaña was replaced by club's veteran Pavelas Leusas. Utenis released him on 30 June 2017.

Career statistics

References

External links
 Malmö FF profile 
 
 

1991 births
Living people
Swedish footballers
Sweden youth international footballers
Swedish people of Serbian descent
BK Forward players
Malmö FF players
IF Limhamn Bunkeflo (men) players
Syrianska FC players
FK Utenis Utena players
Allsvenskan players
Superettan players
Ettan Fotboll players
Division 2 (Swedish football) players
A Lyga players
Swedish expatriate footballers
Expatriate footballers in Lithuania
Swedish expatriate sportspeople in Lithuania
Association football goalkeepers
Sportspeople from Örebro